Graigue may refer to:

 Graigue, Dorrha, County Tipperary, a townland in County Tipperary, Ireland.
Graigue, any one of eleven other townlands in County Tipperary, Ireland
Graiguenamanagh or Graignamanagh, a town in County Kilkenny, Ireland is commonly referred to as Graigue.
Graigue, County Offaly, a townland in County Offaly, Ireland.